Qianjiang Road is a transfer station on Line 2, Line 4 and Line 9 of the Hangzhou Metro in China. It is located in the Jianggan District of Hangzhou. This station offers cross-platform interchange.

Station Layout

Exits
There are four exits, three of them opened during the initial operating.

A shopping concourse was opened in October 2017, near the D entrance.

Gallery

References

Railway stations in Zhejiang
Railway stations in China opened in 2014
Hangzhou Metro stations